Denis Alva Parsons, MBE, ARBS (14 November 1934 – 4 April 2012) was an English sculptor and carver in wood and stone, working in the tradition of "direct carving" technique and figurative bronzes.

Career

Parsons was a sculptor, one of the last traditionally-schooled craftsmen in a long British carving tradition. He was accomplished in "Direct carving" – cutting figures out of a block of stone or wood. This was seen as a primary test of the artist's abilities in releasing the figures "hidden" in the inert materials.

Born near Polesworth, Warwickshire, Parsons spent his whole working career in the Midlands. In the 1950s, he served a seven-year apprenticeship with Robert Bridgeman and Sons, Lichfield, later to become Linford Bridgeman a company concentrating on architectural and ecclesiastical carving and sculpture. At the time, the company employed a substantial team of carvers, each with a specialist skill in figurative sculpture, foliage carving and letter cutting. From each craftsman, Parsons was fortunate to acquire traditional skills that had been developed and handed down over many generations. Later he became the company's head sculptor before setting up his own studio near Lichfield.

In a career lasting over fifty years, Denis Parsons established a reputation in the field of wood and stone carving, both figurative and architectural. A range of his figurative work can be found in locations worldwide. St Joseph's R.C. Church at Darlaston, Wednesbury, West Midlands, features four of his figures. The Samuel Johnson Birthplace Museum in Lichfield, Staffordshire, UK exhibits a figure of Dr Johnson in the round created by Parsons. St Ambrose R.C. Church, Kidderminster displays Parsons' interpretation of St Ambrose in lime wood. The crypt chapel at St Marylebone Parish Church, London, contains a crucifix by Parsons. His work is to be found in many of the great buildings across the UK – including St Paul's Cathedral, the Houses of Parliament, Westminster Abbey where Parsons was responsible for the restoration/replacement of eight large figures and decorative stonework on the North Transept. He worked on major conservation projects for the National Trust including Little Moreton Hall, which is featured in The Building Conservation Directory of 1994.

Parsons demonstrated carving on behalf of The Royal Fine Art Commission (now known as the Commission for Architecture and the Built Environment) at the Royal Academy in July 1989 in the presence of Princess Margaret and an exhibition titled "On the Side of the Angels" at the commission's head office in St James's Square, London, in March 1992 in the presence of The Queen and the Duke of Edinburgh representing Linford Bridgeman, Lichfield. 

In 1992, he was elected an Associate of the Royal British Society of Sculptors, as member 161. 

In 1993, he was awarded the MBE in recognition of his services to conservation. In 2013, The Denis Parsons Foundation was created under the auspices of The City of Lichfield Worshipful Company of Smiths to provide funds to assist local apprentices in practical skills. A tribute to Denis Parson was published in the Lichfield Gazette in June 2013 and again shortly afterwards when they featured the establishment of the Denis Parsons Foundation.

Parsons contributed an article to Practical Woordworking magazine in 1992. Parsons has been featured in many publications, including Public Sculpture of Staffordshire and the Black Country. Parsons talks to Marion Hancock about his career in The Architects' Journal. Parsons is featured in Country Life Magazine, where he was referred to as "one of the country's most expert architectural sculptors".

Gallery

Selected works

References

English woodcarvers
English sculptors
English male sculptors
1934 births
2012 deaths
20th-century English artists
20th-century British sculptors
20th-century English male artists